Koen Jozef van Velsen (born 17 July 1952) is an architect from Hilversum, Netherlands known for his design work on the Discothèque Slinger, rehabilitation center Groot Klimmendaal and the library in Zeewolde. His work employs a contextual design approach, free of a personal esthetic.

Career
Van Velsen completed his formal education at the Academie van de Bouwkunst (Academy of Architecture) in Amsterdam in 1983.

Van Velsen's early work consisted mostly of additions and renovations to existing buildings. He typically incorporated contemporary elements into a historical framework, transforming structures in a way that earned him a reputation for creating "light and transparent" designs. His first major work was the library at Zeewolde, completed in 1989.

Notable projects

References

External links
 Official website 
 

1952 births
Living people
People from Hilversum
20th-century Dutch architects
21st-century Dutch architects